Sturla Holm Lægreid (born 20 February 1997) is a Norwegian biathlete. In the season opener of the 2020–2021 season, he earned his first World Cup win at the 20 km Individual.

Biathlon results
All results are sourced from the International Biathlon Union.

Olympic Games
1 medal (1 gold)

World Championships
9 medals (5 gold, 3 silver, 1 bronze)

*During Olympic seasons competitions are only held for those events not included in the Olympic program.
**The single mixed relay was added as an event in 2019.

World Cup

† – season in progress

Individual podiums
 9 victories 
 21 podium

References

External links

Norwegian male biathletes
1997 births
Living people
Sportspeople from Bærum
Biathlon World Championships medalists
Biathletes at the 2022 Winter Olympics
Olympic biathletes of Norway
Medalists at the 2022 Winter Olympics
Olympic medalists in biathlon
Olympic gold medalists for Norway
21st-century Norwegian people